The Simbirsk Operation was the Bolshevik Red Army's offensive against Vladimir Kappel's anti-Bolshevik People's Army of Komuch and Czechoslovak Legion. The attack came at Simbirsk, on the Eastern Front of the Russian Civil War, in September 1918. The Bolsheviks re-took the city, forcing Kappel's retreat to Ufa, where his force was absorbed by the Siberian Army.

Background 
After the White Army captured Kazan the frontline was not good for the Whites. Near the Kazan 2 - 2.5 thousand men had to hold the 100–120 km of front against about 10 thousand men in two armies (2nd and 5th) of Reds. Whites tried to attack the railway bridge across the Volga River near Sviyazhsk. To support this advance Stanislav Čeček sent Vladimir Kappel's detachment from the Simbirsk to Kazan. On 27 August, Kappel landed on the right bank of Volga near Sviyazhsk and tried to attack the Reds, but was crushed by the counterattack of Latvian Riflemen.

Battle 
Exploiting the temporal weakness of White's Simbirsk Group, 1st Army of Reds led by Mikhail Tukhachevsky on 9 September attack towards Simbirsk. On 11 September White's forces were pushed to the bank of Volga, and on 12 September, Simbirsk was captured by the attack from three sides. During the night of 14 September, Simbirsk Division of 1st Army crossed the Volga River and began to advance on the east.

On 18 September, Kappel's Detachment returned from Kazan (captured by Reds on 9 September) and counterattacked. Reds had to return on the right bank. During 18–24 September, Kappel tried to recapture Simbirsk, but his attacks were repulsed by Reds. After coming the 5th Army and Volga Fleet Red Forces crossed the Volga again, and crushed Kappel's Detachment on 28 September.

Aftermath 
After losing Kazan and Simbirsk the White Forces were demoralized. On 13 September, they left Volsk and began to quickly retreat from the advancing 1st and 5th Armies of Reds. Simbirsk Group of Whites began its retreat on 29 September. The capture of Kazan and Simbirsk were converted by Red's command into the strategic breakthrough across the whole front.

For the capture of Simbirsk the Simbirsk Division of Reds received the honour title "Iron".

References

Sources 
 Н.Е.Какурин, И.И.Вацетис "Гражданская война. 1918-1921" (N.E.Kakurin, I.I.Vacietis "Civil War. 1918-1921") - Sankt-Peterburg, "Polygon" Publishing House, 2002. 

Battles of the Russian Civil War
Czechoslovak Legion
Battles involving Bohemia
September 1918 events
Simbirsk